Seta is a bristle in plants and animals.

Seta may also refer to:

Places 
Šėta, a town in Lithuania
Seta District, Gunma, in Japan
Seta River or Yodo River
Sète, a town in France

Other uses 
Seta (organization), a Finnish LGBTI rights organization
SETA (contractor), civilian employees of government contractors 
SETA Corporation, a Japanese computer game developer
Search for Extraterrestrial Artifacts (SETA), a project in Xenoarchaeology
Sōjirō Seta, a character in Rurouni Kenshin media
Noriyasu Seta, a character in Love Hina media
Sector Education and Training Authority in South Africa
SETA, a Turkish-language abbreviation for Foundation for Political, Economic and Social Research,  a Turkish think tank
For , traditional Japanese footwear, see zori.

See also 
 Ceta (disambiguation)